Iordache is a Romanian surname. Iordăchescu and Iordăcheanu were coined from Iordache. Iordache is of Greek language origin, from Yeorgakis (Γεωργάκης), a patronym from the Modern Greek first name Yiorgos (Γιώργος), from Ancient Greek Georgios (Γεώργιος) (see George).

People with the surname Iordache
Adrian Iordache (born 1980), Romanian footballer
Adrian Dragoş Iordache (born 1981), Romanian footballer
Ilie Iordache (born 1985), Romanian footballer
Larisa Iordache (born 1996), Romanian artistic gymnast
Marius Iordache (born 1978), Romanian footballer
Mihai Iordache (born 1967), Romanian jazz musician and composer
Romaniţa Iordache, Romanian human rights activist
Ştefan Iordache (1941–2008), Romanian actor
Toni Iordache (1942–1988), Romanian traditional musician
Traian Iordache (1911–1999), Romanian football player and manager
Vasile Iordache (born 1950), retired Romanian footballer 
Viorica Iordache (born 1971), Romanian sprint canoer
Mihaela Iordache, Journalist

See also 
 Jordache

 Iordăcheanu
 Iordăchescu, Iordachescu

Romanian-language surnames